György Snell (8 March 1949 – 26 February 2021) was a Hungarian Roman Catholic auxiliary bishop.

Biography
Snell was born in Hungary and was ordained to the priesthood in 1972. He served as auxiliary bishop of Pudentiana and as auxiliary bishop of the Roman Catholic Archdiocese of Esztergom-Budapest from 2014 until his death in 2021 from COVID-19 during the COVID-19 pandemic in Hungary.

Notes

1949 births
2021 deaths
21st-century Roman Catholic bishops in Hungary
People from Csongrád-Csanád County
Deaths from the COVID-19 pandemic in Hungary